Queen Yongui of the Danju Han clan was a Korean queen consort as the second wife of Jeongjong of Goryeo and his first wife's younger sister.

She was the daughter of Han-Jo (한조). Like her older sister, her marriage with Jeongjong just a noble and royal family, didn't have a blood-relationship. At first, she was a Palace Maid (궁인, 宮人), but later honoured as Princess Hyeondeok (현덕궁주, 玄德宮主) and lived in Mallyeong Palace (만령궁, 萬齡宮).

Two years after her older sister died, on 1 April 1038, Jeongjong gave her a royal title as Beautiful Consort Han (여비 한씨, 麗妃 韓氏) and Princess Changseong (창성궁주, 昌盛宮主). Later, in February 1040 (6th year reign of Jeongjong), she formally became Queen Consort of Goryeo and bore him 3 sons, but all of her son weren't ascended the throne.

References

External links
Queen Yongui in Encykorea .
용의왕후 on Doosan Encyclopedia .

Royal consorts of the Goryeo Dynasty
Korean queens consort
Year of birth unknown
Year of death unknown
Date of birth unknown
Date of death unknown